Marsh Ridge is a rocky ridge in Antarctica,  long. The ridge was mapped by the United States Geological Survey from ground surveys and U.S. Navy air photos, 1960–63, and was named by the Advisory Committee on Antarctic Names for Robert D. Marsh, a cook with the Byrd Station winter party, 1957.

References

Ridges of Marie Byrd Land